is the stage name of , a Japanese enka singer-songwriter.

Enka is a genre akin to Japanese folk music or blues music in the Western world. He has released several popular albums. Amongst his most famous hits are "Sake-yo", "Suika", and "Yuki Guni".

He also claimed that he became the first popular hip hop artist in Japan by his 1984 song "Ora Tokyo sa Iguda" (lit. "I'm going to Tokyo"), which is sung in the Tsugaru dialect of Japanese.

He has been on tour with fellow Japanese star Fukui Kodai.

His wife is named Hisako, and they have a daughter, Ikumi.

Discography (incomplete) 

 Ora ha zettai! Presley : I'm an "Elvis Presley" indeed!
 Ora Tokyo sa igu da : A farewell to the Rural
 Yuki Guni : Snow Country
 Sake yo : Sipping and drinking 
 Suika : Drunken Song
 Dream
 Shutcho Monogatari : My Dekasegi memories
 Tachineputa
 Kaze ni Fukarete :  Blown with the wind
 Tsugaru

Filmography

Film
Cape Nostalgia (2014)

Television
Reach Beyond the Blue Sky (2021), Tokugawa Ieyoshi

References

External links 
 Ikuzo honored by the Hawaii County Police Department

1952 births
Japanese male singer-songwriters
Japanese singer-songwriters
Enka singers
Writers from Aomori Prefecture
Living people
Musicians from Aomori Prefecture